The Clare Under-21 Football Championship is an annual Gaelic Athletic Association club competition between the under-21 Gaelic Football clubs in Clare.

The current (2022) champions are Ennistymon who defeated their North Clare neighbours Corofin in the final on  a score line of 1-10 to 0-06.

Roll of honour

List of finals

 Cill Cúil Gaels were an underage amalgamation of the Coolmeen, Kildysart, Kilmihil and Shannon Gaels football clubs from Mid-West Clare who won the 2021 title defeating Éire Óg, Ennis in the final.

 Clann Lír were an underage amalgamation that was composed of the Kilfenora, Liscannor and Michael Cusack's football clubs from North Clare. They lost the 2014 final to Éire Óg, Ennis.

See also
 Clare Senior Football Championship
 Clare Football League Div. 1 (Cusack Cup)
 Clare Intermediate Football Championship
 Clare Junior A Football Championship

1